Luke Andrew Doran (born 14 August 1991 in Baulkham Hills, Sydney, New South Wales) is an Australian cricketer who plays for the Sydney Sixers and the New South Wales Blues. He was a member of Australia's 2010 Under-19 Cricket World Cup squad which won the 2010 Under-19 Cricket World Cup in New Zealand. He has played in three List A matches for New South Wales, and 15 Big Bash games for the Sydney Sixers. Doran did not play in the 2015–16 Big Bash League season due to a side strain, although he was in the Sixers semi-final squad.

Doran previously represented the Fairfield-Liverpool Lions, and now also represents Lindisfarne in the Cricket Tasmania Premier League; in the 2015 final, Doran was dismissed for 87 and infamously threw his bat at the match official.

He is the older brother of cricketer Jake Doran and Micheal Doran who attends and is currently at Luke/s old school The Hills Sports High School.

See also
 List of New South Wales representative cricketers

References

External links
 

Living people
1991 births
New South Wales cricketers
Australian cricketers
Sydney Sixers cricketers
Cricketers from Sydney
Sydney Thunder cricketers